Sayid Mohamed Abdullahi Hassan (1856–1920) was a Somali religious and military leader of the Dervish movement, which led a two-decade long confrontation with various colonial empires including the British, Italians, and Ethiopians.

Background
Due to his successful completion of the hajj to Mecca, his complete memorization of the Quran and his purported descent from the Islamic prophet Muhammad, his name is sometimes preluded with honorifics such as Hajji, Hafiz or Sayyid.

Muhammad `Abd Allāh al-Hasan; Sayyid Muḥammad ibn 'Abdallāh was born to a Bah Cali Gheri mother and Ogaden father. Due to his influence in the precipitation of Somali nationalism, the Central Powers, contemporary fanciers sometimes refer to him as the Father of Somali nationalism. In 1917, the Ottoman Empire referred to Hassan as the "Emir of the Somali".

According to Douglas Jardine, the name 'Mad Mullah' did not originate with the British or the Italians as is often thought, but is a translation of the Somali expression wadaad waal (the Mullah that is a lunatic) used by Somalis in Berbera. One Somali poet at the time, Ali Jama Habil composed a poem titled 'Maxamed Waal''' (Mohamed the Lunatic). According to apologist Said Sheikh Samatar the Somali word waalan covers a spectrum that ranges from sheer lunacy through 'lunatic' valour to an other worldly inner serenity.

In Berbera the established Qadiriyya tariqa would soon be challenged by a new tariqa. The most prominent Sheikh of the Salihiyya order were Isma'il ibn Ishaq al-Urwayni and the Dervish emir Hassan (called Mullah by British) who arrived in Berbera in 1895 and constructed his own mosque and began propagating. He was strongly against khat and chewing tobacco, both of which the Qadiriyya had permitted. Amongst other disputes, he would come to debate the leading Qadiriyya sheikhs of Berbera including Aw Gaas and Xaaji Ibrahim Xirsi. Sheikh Madar, the leader of Somali Qadiriyya was invited to participate in 1897 and after rigorous discussion, the Qadiriyya tariqa had proved victorious and Mohamed Abdullah Hassan had been refuted. British authorities took note of the disturbance and turmoil and he was thus expelled from the city. The divisions were deep and both sides had accused the other of heresy, Hassan would go on to form the Dervish movement based on Salihiyya just two years after the debates partly in rebuke of the Qadiriyya status quo.

In March 1899, one Duwaleh Hirsi a former member of  the Somali Aden police then Mr Percy Cox's (former counsel-resident of Zeila and Berbera, 1893–1895) expedition guide in Somaliland allegedly stole a rifle and sold it to the tariqa at Kob Fardod.  The vice-counsel at the coast, Harry Edward Spiller Cordeaux, sent a letter to the mullahs at Kob Fardod demanding the return of the rifle.  The letter was carried by a Somali mounted policeman named Ahmed Adan. Upon his return after the delivery of the letter,  Cordeaux interviewed Adan, who provided the following information:

I knew many of the people there—some of them were relations of mine. My brother-in-law, Dualeh Aoreb, was there. I asked them if they had any rifles, they said they at first had only six, but had just received fifty-five from Hafoon. I saw two or three of the new lot, they are Martins(new). They told me they had one or two "14-shot rifles." I saw some Mullahs walking about with Sniders. The Sheikh himself and some of his Mullahs used to practice daily shooting at a target; they put up a shield against a tree. I used to talk with people every day. We talked about many things, some of the words they said were good and others were bad. They called me a Kafir, and laughed at my uniform, saying that I smelt, and asking me why I wore the Sircars clothes. There were hundreds of people there, some from every tribe, Dolbahanta, Habr Toljaala, and Habr Yunis.

What is particularly revealing about Ahmed Adan's interview is the confusion that was caused by another letter carried by a Somali, supposedly also from the British administration at the coast. This second letter angered the mullahs at the Tariqa ;

"On the third day the Mullah sent
for me. I had seen him before;
he often used to come into
the house. I went to him, and
he said he would give me
his reply to the letter I had
brought; that he had just
received another letter which
had been brought by a
Somali. He asked me about it,
but I told him I knew
nothing about it, and asked
him who had brought it. He
said, “A Somali.” A man named
Salan had come in that
day. I thought that he must
have brought the letter. He
then gave me a letter. It was
written on the back of the
letter I had brought him. I
saw the Government stamp on
it. He (the Sheikh) said,
“This is the reply to your letter. I
will give you the answer to
the other letter to-morrow.”
He said that the second letter
contained “bad words.” Next
morning he gave me two
letters, and I then went away,
and got into Berbera on
Saturday night.”

The second letter provoked the mullahs, the hostile tone in the reply is due to the offensive second letter carried by Salaan the Somali. Both replies; one regarding the rifle curt but relatively inoffensive and a second addressing the confusing insolent second letter are in the British record.

The Dervish War

The news that sparked the Dervish rebellion and the 21 year disturbance according to the consul-general James Hayes Sadler was either spread or concocted by Sultan Nur of the Habr Yunis. The incident in question was that of a group of Somali children that were converted to Christianity and adopted by the French Catholic Mission at Berbera in 1899. Whether Sultan Nur experienced the incident first hand or whether he was told of it is not clear but what is known is that he propagated the incident in the Tariqa at Kob Fardod in June 1899. In one of his letters to Sultan Deria in 1899, Sayyid Hassan said that the British "have destroyed our religion and made our children their children" alluding to Sultan Nur's incident with the Roman French Mission at Berbera. The Dervishes soon emerged as an opposition of the Christian activities, defending their version of Islam against the Christian mission.

Risala lil-Bimal: Letter to the Bimal
There are only one people during the Dervish struggle the Sayyid extensively asked in a letter to join his struggle. Those were the Bimal clan. His letter to the Bimal was documented as the most extended exposition of his mind as a Muslim thinker and religious figure. The letter is until this day still preserved. It is said that the Bimal thanks to their size being numerically powerful, traditionally and religiously devoted fierce warriors and having possession of much resources have intrigued Mahamed Abdulle Hassan. But not only that the Bimal themselves mounted an extensive and major resistance against the Italians, especially in the first decade of the 19th century. The Italians carried many expeditions against the powerful Bimal to try and pacify them. Because of this the Bimal had all the reason to join the Dervish struggle and by doing so to win their support over the Sayyid wrote a detailed theological statement to put forward to the Bimal tribe who dominated the strategic Banaadir port of Merca and its surroundings.

One of the Italian's greatest fears was the spread of 'Dervishism' ( had come to mean revolt) in the south and the strong Bimaal tribe of Benadir whom already were at war with the Italians, while not following the religious message or adhering to the views of Muhammad Abdullah Hassan, understood greatly his goal and political tactics. The dervishes in this case were engaged in supplying arms to the Bimaal. The Italians wanted to bring in an end to the Bimaal revolt and at all cost prevent a Bimal-Dervish alliance, which lead them to use the  forces of Obbia and the Mijertein as prevention.

Ethiopia, Britain and Italy
However, soon angered by his autocratic rule, Hussen Hirsi Dala Iljech' – a Mohammed Subeer chieftain – plotted to kill him. The news of the plot leaked to Hassan. He escaped but his maternal uncle, Aw 'Abbas, was killed. Some weeks later, Mohammed Subeer sent a peace delegation of 32 men to Hassan, but he had all the members of the delegation arrested and killed. Shocked by this, Mohammed Subeer sought the help of the Ethiopians and the Dervish withdrew to Nugaal.

Towards the end of 1900, Ethiopian Emperor Menelik proposed a joint action with the British against the Dervish. Accordingly, British Lt. Col. Eric John Eagles Swayne assembled a force of 1,500 Somali soldiers led by 21 European officers and started from Burco on 22 May 1901, while an Ethiopian army of 15,000 soldiers started from Harar to join the British forces intent on crushing the 20,000 Dervish fighters (of whom 40 percent were cavalry).

On 9 January 1904, at the Jidaale (Jidballi) plain, the British Commander, General Charles Egerton, killed 1,000 Dervish. This defeat forced Sayyid and his remaining men to flee to Majeerteen country.

Around 1909, in a secret meeting under a big tree later nicknamed "Anjeel tale waa" ("The Tree of Bad Counsel"), about 400 Dervish followers decided to stop following the mullah upon receiving the expulsion letter from the head of the Tariqa, Sheikh Salah, excommunicating the mullah. Their departure weakened, demoralized and angered Sayyid, and it was at this juncture that he composed his poem entitled The Tree of Bad Counsel.

Fight against the Qadiriyya
Despite leaving Berbera after being rebuked by the leading Sheikhs of the rival Qadiriyya school the enmity did not end. Heated poems would be exchanged between the Sayyid and prominent Sheikh Uways al-Barawi from Barawa, the leader of the 1908 Benadir revolt.

Uways recited this qasida criticizing the Sayyid:

With a long response the Sayyid ended with these sharp words:
A word from the backsliding apostates (Qadiriyya)
Who have gone astray from the Prophet's way, the straight path
Why is the truth so plain, hidden from you?
This exchange would lead to takfir or accusations of apostasy from both men and the murder of Uways by the Dervish in 1909. This ironically proved Sheikh Uways' accusation that the Sayyid deemed it lawful to spill the blood of the learned. The Sayyid would mock Sheikh Uways death with a final poem Behold, at last, when we slew the old wizard, the rains began to come!".

Consolidation

During 1909-1910, the dervish capital moved from Illig to Taleh in the heart of Nugal where the dervish built three garrison forts of massive stone work and a number of houses. He built a luxurious palace for himself and kept new guards drawn from outcast clans. By 1913, the dervish dominated the entire hinterland of the Somali peninsula building forts at Jildali and Mirashi, and at Werder in the Ogaden and Beledweyne in southern Somalia. On 9 August 1913, at the Battle of Dul Madoba, a Dervish force raided the Dolbahanta clan and killed or wounded 57 members of the 110-man Somaliland Camel Constabulary. The dead included the British officer who commanded the constabulary, Colonel Richard Corfield. Hassan memorialized this action in his poem simply entitled "The Death of Richard Corfield". In the same year, fourteen Dervishes infiltrated Berbera and fired few shots on its citizens fleeing, nonetheless causing panic. In 1914, the Somaliland Camel Corps was founded as an expanded and improved version of the constabulary.

A British force was gathering against the Dervishes when they were interrupted by the outbreak of World War I. Among the British officers deployed was Adrian Carton de Wiart (later Lieutenant General), who lost an eye during the campaign, and Hastings Ismay, a staff officer who was later Winston Churchill's chief military adviser.

Defeat

In the beginning of 1920, the British struck the Dervish settlements with a well-coordinated air and land attack and inflicted a stunning defeat. The forts of the dervishes were damaged and the army suffered great losses. They hastily fled to Ogaden. Here, again with the help of his patriotic poetry and charisma, he tried to rebuild his army and accomplish the coalition of Ogaden clans, which made him a power in the land once again.

Death
On 21 December 1920, Hassan died of influenza at the age of 64, his grave is believed to be somewhere close to Imi town of the Somali Region of Ethiopia; however, the exact spot of the Sayid's grave is unknown. In mid 2009, the Somali Regional State administration announced that they would exhume his remains and rebury them in his old castle at Imi. Most of the people who knew the exact location of Hassan's tomb were long dead, but the Regional Information Minister Guled Casowe told VOA Somali Section that a few, very old individuals might be left and they would be able to reveal the details of Hassan's grave. Remains were found in a graveyard at Gindhir and the Somali Region of Ethiopia then tried to test the DNA to determine whether they could be those of Sayid Mohammed Abdullah Hassan.

Legacy

The efforts and fervor of the erstwhile Anti-colonial leader of the Somali Dervish movement, who by the time of his death had reclaimed and united large swathes of the lands historically territorial to the Somali peoples, to this day inspires and mobilizes the autochthonous peoples of Somalia to form a consolidated bulwark against imperialism (namely that of Ethiopia) as captured in the struggles of the Islamic Courts Union, the Ogaden National Liberation Front, and the former Western Somali Liberation Front. Hassan has thus become more than just a token of pride for the various sectional groups in Somalia, but has also been seen by some as icon of Pan-Somalism, at times even distinguished as one of the great revolutionaries of the turn of the 20th century by notable Pan-Africanist movements, who led the Senussid resistance against the Italians. Hassan's reputation thus transcends the very borders he sought to liberate from foreign rule and domination, the very essence of the Pan-Africanist movement.

A Socialist realist statue of Hassan riding his favourite horse Hiin-Faniin (sometimes called Sayidka or Siyadka) was built in central Mogadishu across the Mogadishu Central Mosque before 1972 (or in the 1980s by Barre's regime), but was torn down between 1991 and 1993 and sold as scrap metal. The damaged foundation of the monument was left standing. On 18 October 2019, the monument was restored and unveiled by Somali president Mohamed Abdullahi Mohamed, along with other restored monuments. A similar statue was built in the Ethiopian city of Jijiga in 2013.

In the Haud region, there is a monument marking Hassan's place of birth called Sacmadeeqa.

Media

In popular culture
 The documentary film The Parching Winds of Somalia includes a section on the Dervish struggle and its leader Mohammed Abdullah Hassan.
 The historic romance novel Ignorance is the Enemy of Love by Farah Mohamed Jama Awl has a Dervish protagonist called Calimaax, who is part of an ill-fated love story and fights against the British, Italians and Ethiopians in the Horn of Africa.
 A 1983, film entitled A Somali Dervish was directed by Abdulkadir Ahmed Said.
 In the Law & Order: Criminal Intent episode "Loyalty", references are made to the Dervishes and their leader. The episode also features a character purported to have been descended from Muhammad Abdullah Hassan.
 In 1985, a 4-hour and 40 minute Indian-produced epic film by filmmaker Salah Ahmed entitled the Somalia Dervishes went into production. With a budget of $1.8 million, it included an actual descendant of Hassan as its star, and featured hundreds of actors and extras.
 In the popular comic book series Corto Maltese, the protagonist travels to the Horn of Africa during the Dervishes' battle against the British, and witnesses the former power storm a British fort. During these travels, he develops a long-term friendship with a Dervish warrior named Cush, who subsequently features in several other of Corto's adventures around the world.

Poems
Some poems by the Sayid include:
Haddaan waayey
Maqashiiya uunka is a religious and nationalist appeal
Afbakayle, which deals with treachery and etiquette 
Mariyama Shiikh, which deals with clemency
Dardaaran, says there is a hidden malicious intent behind stipends paid by colonialists

See also

 Haji Sudi- One of the founding members of the Dervish movement and the chief military commander.
 Abdullahi Sadiq - Governor of Ogaden
 Sultan Nur- Sultan of the Habr Yunis clan and one of the founding members of the Dervish movement and the Dervish Sultan.
 Hasna Doreh – wife of Mohammed Abdullah Hassan.
Ismail Mire -  A soldier and a bard .
 Sheikh Uways Al-Barawi religious rival of the Sayyid and leader of the Benadir revolt
 Bashir Yussuf – Somali religious leader who fought against the British alongside Mohammed Abdullah Hassan.
 Ahmad ibn Ibrihim al-Ghazi – Somali Imam and General of the Sultanate of Adal
 Sheikh Madar leader of the Qadiriyya tariqa and scholarly rival/opponent of the Salihiyya and Dervish 
 John Gough – Awarded a Victoria Cross for his actions as a column commander during the Third Somaliland Expedition against Hassan.
 Alexander Stanhope Cobbe – Awarded a Victoria Cross for his actions at Erego 1902.
 Adrian Carton de Wiart – British army officer who lost an eye attacking a fort at Shimbiris in 1914

Notes

References
Abdisalam Issa-Salwe, The Failure of The Daraawiish State, The Clash Between Somali Clanship and State System, paper presented at the 5th International Congress of Somali Studies, December 1993 
Abdi Sheik Abdi, Divine Madness: Mohammed Abdulle Hassan (1856–1920), Zed Books Ltd., London, 1993
Battersby, Henry Francis Prevost. Richard Corfield of Somaliland (1914), ASIN: B000WFUQT8.
Jaamac Cumar Ciise, Taariikhdii Daraawiishta iyo Sayid Maxamed Cabdulle Xasan, (1895–1921), Wasaaradda Hiddaha iyo Tacliinta Sare, edited by Akadeemiyaha Dhaqanka, Mogadishu, 1976.
Jardine, Douglas J., The Mad Mullah of Somaliland, H. Jenkins, 1923.
McNeill, Malcolm, In Pursuit of the 'Mad' Mullah, 1902.
Said S. Samatar, Oral Poetry and Somali Nationalism: The Case of Sayyid Mahammad Abdille Hasan, Cambridge: Cambridge University Press, 1982 (analyzes Mahammad Abdille's poetry and assesses his nationalist and literary contributions to the Somali heritage)
 Silberman, Leo. "The 'mad' Mullah: Hero Of Somali Nationalism." History Today (Aug 1960) 10#8 pp 523–534.
Skoulding, F.A. With 'Z' Unit in Somaliland, RAF Quarterly 2, no.3, (July 1931), pp. 387–396.
Swayne, H.G.C., Seventeen Trips through Somaliland and a visit to Abyssinia: With Supplementary preface on the 'Mad Mullah' risings, 1903.

Somali nationalists
Somalian politicians
1856 births
1920 deaths
Somalian Muslims
Somalian religious leaders
Deaths from Spanish flu
Darod